Alexandru Cantacuzino was a Romanian politician who served as the Minister of Foreign Affairs from June 24, 1862, until September 29, 1862, and as the Minister of Finance from July 12, 1862, until March 16, 1863.

Romanian Ministers of Finance
Romanian Ministers of Foreign Affairs
19th-century Romanian politicians
Year of death missing
Year of birth missing
Alexandru